Teatralna is a station currently under construction on the Dnipro Metro's Tsentralno–Zavodska Line. Deputy Mayor of Dnipro Mykhailo Lysenko stated in December 2020 that it was estimated to be opened in 2024. The station is named for its proximity next to the city's drama theatre and the theatre of opera and ballet.

History
The station was already envisioned in the 1980 official planning of the city's metro lines. It was originally scheduled to be opened in 1993 as Park Chkalova (the 1980 plans referred to the station as "Teatralna"), the station's construction was delayed significantly after the fall of the Soviet Union. Budget issues and economic instability in Ukraine further delayed the station's opening.

As an expansion of the current Dnipro Metro the station was projected to be opened by 2015. But construction was stopped because the tender to select the contractor was stopped by the city council in August 2015.

In 2014 it was not known what final form the station would take on; whether it would be a deep column or a single-vault station. The station will be of the single-vault type.

Notes

References

External links
 (Images of the station under construction) 

Dnipro Metro stations
Railway stations scheduled to open in 2024